Judit Temes (10 October 1930 – 11 August 2013) was a Hungarian swimmer and Olympic champion.

Temes, who was Jewish, was born in Sopron. She competed at the 1952 Olympic Games in Helsinki, where she received a bronze medal in 100 m freestyle, and a gold medal in 4 × 100 m freestyle relay.

After retirement she pursued a medical career and earned her medical degree in 1955 from the Budapest University of Medicine. Later on she worked for the university pathology department and cancer research institute and then headed the St. Elizabeth Hospital Department of Pathology.

See also
List of select Jewish swimmers

References
 

1930 births
2013 deaths
Hungarian female freestyle swimmers
Hungarian Jews
Jewish swimmers
Olympic swimmers of Hungary
Swimmers at the 1948 Summer Olympics
Swimmers at the 1952 Summer Olympics
Swimmers at the 1956 Summer Olympics
Olympic gold medalists for Hungary
Olympic bronze medalists for Hungary
World record setters in swimming
People from Sopron
Olympic bronze medalists in swimming
European Aquatics Championships medalists in swimming
Medalists at the 1952 Summer Olympics
Olympic gold medalists in swimming
Jewish physicians
Jewish Hungarian sportspeople
Jewish Hungarian scientists